Eastern Oklahoma Catholic is a monthly magazine (combined in January/February and July/August) published by the Diocese of Tulsa.  A subscription rate of $35 a year is requested for those persons who are interested in receiving the publication. The current publisher of the newspaper is Edward James Slattery, Bishop of Tulsa.

See also
Sooner Catholic (newspaper of the Oklahoma City Archdiocese)

References

External links
 Links to recent issues of Eastern Oklahoma Catholic
Diocese of Tulsa official website

Roman Catholic Diocese of Tulsa
Catholic magazines published in the United States
Newspapers published in Tulsa, Oklahoma
Catholic Church in Oklahoma